The Statue of Jefferson Davis was unveiled in the Kentucky State Capitol Rotunda, in Frankfort, Kentucky on December 10, 1936. It depicts Jefferson Davis, president of the Confederate States of America. It was erected under the auspices of the United Daughters of the Confederacy. It remained there until June 13, 2020. The Historic Properties Advisory Commission voted to move the statue out of the Rotunda to the Jefferson Davis State Historic Site near Fairview, Kentucky.

There were two plaques affixed to the base of the statue, which read:

In 2018, the second plaque was removed.

References

External links

 

1936 establishments in Kentucky
1936 sculptures
Monuments and memorials in the United States removed during the George Floyd protests
Buildings and structures in Frankfort, Kentucky
United Daughters of the Confederacy monuments and memorials in Kentucky
Marble sculptures in Kentucky
Relocated buildings and structures in Kentucky
Removed Confederate States of America monuments and memorials
Sculptures of men in Kentucky
Statues in Kentucky
Statues of Jefferson Davis
Statues removed in 2020